Cajsa Andersson (born 19 January 1993) is a Swedish football goalkeeper who plays for Linköpings FC and the Sweden national team.

Honours 
Linköpings FC
Winner
 Damallsvenskan: 2016, 2017
 Svenska Cupen: 2014–15

Runner-up
 Svenska Supercupen: 2015

External links 
 

Living people
1993 births
Swedish women's footballers
Linköpings FC players
Damallsvenskan players
Women's association football goalkeepers
Piteå IF (women) players
Footballers from Stockholm
Sweden women's international footballers